Sung Hoon (Hangul: 성훈, born August 29, 1980), is a South Korean singer and member of Brown Eyed Soul, signed under in Next Music. He released his debut solo album, Lyrics Within My Story, on September 22, 2011.

Discography

Studio albums

Singles

Soundtrack appearances

References

1980 births
Living people
South Korean rhythm and blues singers
South Korean pop singers
21st-century South Korean  male  singers